Balus may refer to:
Balus, Iran
Balus River, in Romania
Alexander Balus